

Track listing
"The Sun"
"I Stand Strong"
"Come Come"
"Take A Look"
"Mek We Dweet"
"Great Men"
"Jah Kingdom"
"Mi Gi Dem"
"Peace"

Credits
Produced by Winston Rodney for Burning Music Productions
All songs written by Winston Rodney
Published by Burning Spear Publishing, PRS
Recorded on tour at various venues throughout the U.S.A. during the summer of 1993
Recorded and mixed by Mervyn Williams
Re-mixed by Michael Sauvage at Pilot Studio, N.Y.
Mastered at Northeast Digital by Dr. Toby Mountain
Photography by David Corio
Design by Nancy Given
Special thanks to: Archibald "Tedo" Davis, Andre' Duncan, Sonia Rodney and to all Burning Spear fans all over the world

Musicians
Winston Rodney - vocals, percussion
Burning Band:
Nelson Miller - drums
Paul Beckford - bass
Lenford Richards - lead guitar
Lenval Jarrett - rhythm guitar
Alvin Haughton - percussion
Jay Noel - keyboards
James Smith - trumpet
Charles Dickey - trombone
Mark Wilson - saxophone

1994 live albums
Burning Spear live albums